Mount Greylock State Reservation is public recreation and nature preservation area on and around Mount Greylock, the highest point in the U.S. state of Massachusetts. It was created in 1898 as Massachusetts' first public land for the purpose of forest preservation.

History
Mount Greylock State Reservation was created in 1898 when the state legislature passed Chapter 543 of the Acts of 1898, which appropriated $25,000 for land purchases and created the Greylock Reservation Commission as overseer.

The  Veterans War Memorial Tower that crowns the summit of the mountain was built 1931-32 and dedicated on June 30, 1933.

Workers with the Civilian Conservation Corps were active in the reservation during the 1930s. Their efforts, undertaken from 1933 to 1939, included construction of the Bascom Lodge, the Thunderbolt Ski Trail, Thunderbolt Shelter, and improved road access to the summit.

A two-year Historic Parkway Rehabilitation Project undertaken during 2008 and 2009 restored the reservation's road system,  offering numerous scenic viewing opportunities along the state-designated Scenic Byway.

Activities and amenities
Roads to the summit of Mount Greylock are open seasonally, weather permitting. At the summit, Bascom Lodge offers overnight accommodations and meals during non-winter months. The reservation's  of trails for hiking, mountain biking, back-country skiing, snowshoeing and snowmobiling include an  section of the Appalachian National Scenic Trail and the historic Thunderbolt Ski Trail. Primitive camping is available for backpackers at either the Mount Greylock Campground or remote trailside backpacker shelters, all of which are only accessible by foot. Hunting is permitted in season.

References

External links

Mount Greylock State Reservation Department of Conservation and Recreation
Mount Greylock State Reservation Map Department of Conservation and Recreation
Hiking Trail Mileages: Mount Greylock State Reservation Department of Conservation and Recreation

State parks of Massachusetts
State parks of the Appalachians
Parks in Berkshire County, Massachusetts
Campgrounds in Massachusetts
Civilian Conservation Corps in Massachusetts
Historic American Landscapes Survey in Massachusetts
Lanesborough, Massachusetts